Tadahito (written: 資仁 or 只仁) is a masculine Japanese given name. Notable people with the name include:

 (born 1974), Japanese baseball player
 (1919–1999), Japanese animator

Japanese masculine given names